The 2019 Fermanagh Senior Football Championship was the 113th edition of the Fermanagh GAA's premier club Gaelic football tournament for senior clubs in County Fermanagh, Northern Ireland. The tournament consists of eight teams, with the winner representing Fermanagh in the Ulster Senior Club Football Championship. The championship had a straight knock-out format.

Derrygonnelly Harps were the four-time defending champions after defeating Ederney St Joseph's in the previous years final.

Derrygonnelly successfully completed their five-in-a-row by beating Roslea Shamrocks by 0-10 to 1-3 in the final.

Team changes
The following teams have changed division since the 2018 championship season.

To Championship
Promoted from 2019 Intermediate Championship
 Belnaleck Art McMurroughs - (Intermediate Champions)

From Championship
Relegated to 2019 Intermediate Championship
 Belcoo O'Rahillys - (Relegation Play-off Losers)

Bracket

Quarter-finals

Semi-finals

Final

Relegation playoffs
The four losers of the quarter-finals playoff in this round. The two losers will face off in a relegation final, with the loser to be relegated to the 2020 Intermediate Football Championship.

Relegation semi-finals

Relegation final

Ulster Senior Club Football Championship

References

Fermanagh Senior Football Championship
Fermanagh SFC
Fermanagh Senior Football Championship